PYD or pyd may refer to:

 "PYD" (song), a 2013 single by Justin Bieber
 Democratic Union Party (Syria) (Partiya Yekîtiya Demokrat), a Kurdish Syrian political party
 Pyrin domain (PYD), or the protein domain
 Positive youth development
 .pyd, a file extension for the Python programming language